This is a list of airlines currently operating in Serbia.

Scheduled airlines

Charter airlines

See also
 List of defunct airlines of Serbia
 List of airlines of Yugoslavia

External links
 Registered operators

Serbia
Airlines
Airlines
Serbia